Rapid Global School (RGS) is a co-educational independent school in Bidhuna, Uttar Pradesh, India. It provides education from nursery to 12th class.

The school is affiliated to the Central Board of Secondary Education. Admission for school begins in the month of March. An application process must be completed by mid January, and then potential students attend an entrance test and "Selection" interview. Most students are given admission in the school between the age two-and-half to three years.

Sports 

Sports are an integral part of the school curriculum. The school has large playing grounds, one outdoor and one indoor. The sports played in RGS include cricket, basketball, football, Table Tennis, Badminton, chess, Boxing, Kabaddi Kho-kho, Kabaddi, Athletics (races, shot put, hurdles, javelin) etc.  Sports at RGS is dominated by Kabaddi. Sports day at RGS is organised each year by Prakreed.

Activities 

RGS supports and encourages boys and girls to explore the world and all that it has to offer; this is also true to beyond the classroom. There are endless opportunities for the boys to discover their individual talents and passions and develop them through participating in these activities. Some activities in RGS campus are adventure activities, Vedic activities, Plantation Day etc.

Gallery

External links
 

Primary schools in Uttar Pradesh
High schools and secondary schools in Uttar Pradesh
Auraiya district